Savage: From Whitechapel to the Wild West on the Track of Jack the Ripper is a 1993 historical fiction horror novel by Richard Laymon. It begins with Jack the Ripper's final, gruesome killing of Mary Jane Kelly, and a young boy who is concealed under the bed during the attack. The boy then tracks the killer to the New World, first to NYC and then to the American West.

References

1993 novels
Cultural depictions of Jack the Ripper